Teatro is the 45th studio album by Willie Nelson, released in September 1998 via Island Records. Filmmaker Wim Wenders produced a documentary feature-length film of the recording sessions and live performances.

Background
The recording sessions for the album were held in an old movie theater in Oxnard, California and were produced by Daniel Lanois. The album features backing vocals by Emmylou Harris, as well as backing by regular Nelson harmonicist Mickey Raphael and Nelson's sister, Bobbie Nelson, on piano. The majority of the songs are composed by Nelson, and most are re-recordings of songs he wrote and first recorded in the 1960s: "Darkness on the Face of the Earth" (1961), "My Own Peculiar Way" (1964), "Home Motel" (1962), "I Just Can't Let You Say Goodbye" (1968), "I've Just Destroyed the World (1962) and "Three Days" (1962).

Lanois contributes one of his songs, "The Maker" (originally released on his album Acadie), and plays electric guitar and bass, and also took the photograph for the album cover. Mark Howard recorded and mixed the record.

Teatro is noted for its spare, yet drum-heavy and atmospheric sound, credited to Lanois, who'd also produced Harris' alternative country album, Wrecking Ball.

Teatro was reissued in 2017 by Light in the Attic Records with 7 bonus tracks and the dvd of the documentary by Wim Wenders.

Track listing
All songs written by Willie Nelson, except where noted.

"Ou Es-Tu, Mon Amour? (Where Are You, My Love?)" (Emile Stehn, Henri LeMarchand) – 2:43
"I Never Cared For You" – 2:18
"Everywhere I Go" – 3:50
"Darkness on the Face of the Earth" – 2:33
"My Own Peculiar Way" – 3:37
"These Lonely Nights" (Chester Odom) – 3:29
"Home Motel" – 3:15
"The Maker" (Daniel Lanois) – 5:08
"I Just Can't Let You Say Goodbye" – 4:38
"I've Just Destroyed the World (I'm Living In)" (Nelson, Ray Price) – 2:52
"Somebody Pick Up My Pieces" – 4:39
"Three Days" – 3:07
"I've Loved You All Over the World" – 4:18
"Annie" – 3:51
(bonus) "It Should Be Easier Now" - 3:15
(bonus) "One Step Beyond" - 3:38
(bonus) "Send Me the Pillow That You Dream On" (Hank Locklin) - 3:09
(bonus) "Have I Told You Lately That I Love You" (Scotty Wiseman) - 3:39
(bonus) "Till I Gain Control Again" (Rodney Crowell) - 6:17
(bonus) "Lonely Little Mansion" - 4:03
(bonus) "Things To Remember" - 2:50

Personnel
Willie Nelson – vocals, acoustic guitar, electric guitar
Emmylou Harris – background vocals on all tracks except 1, 6, 7 & 14
Daniel Lanois – producer, gibson les paul, bass guitar
Tony Mangurian – drums, percussion
Victor Indrizzo – drums, percussion
Bobbie Nelson – wurlitzer electric piano, organ
Brian Griffiths – guitars, slide guitar, mandolin
Mickey Raphael – harmonica, bass harmonica
Brad Mehldau – vibraphone, piano
Malcolm Burn – organ
Jeffrey Green – drums, omnichord, keyboard
Cyril Neville  – congas

Chart performance

See also
The Monsanto Years – a 2015 Neil Young album featuring Nelson's sons and also recorded at the Teatro theater

References

1998 albums
Willie Nelson albums
Albums produced by Daniel Lanois
Island Records albums